The 2010 Purdue Boilermakers football team represented Purdue University in the 2010 NCAA Division I FBS football season. They played their home games at Ross–Ade Stadium in West Lafayette, Indiana and competed in the Big Ten Conference. It was Danny Hope's second season as head coach. The Boilermakers finished the season 4–8, 2–6 in Big Ten play.

Before the season
The Boilermakers were looking to improve on a 5–7 record (4–4 in conference play) in 2009, in which they finished 7th in the Big Ten conference. The offense will be led by Robert Marve, the highly rated transfer from Miami (FL), who was named the starting quarterback. They also planned on using Rob Henry at the quarterback position. The running backs were going to be led by Ralph Bolden, who nearly had a 1,000 yard season in 2009, but tore his ACL and missed the 2010 season. The receiving core returns its 2009 leader in receptions, yards and touchdowns, Keith Smith, as well as Antavian Edison who saw significant playing time during the 2009 season as a true freshman. On the defense, the linemen will be led by Ryan Kerrigan, who was selected as a Phil Steele preseason 1st Team All-Big Ten, the team's top returning sack man. The linebacking group returns all three starters from a season ago, which includes Dwayne Beckford and Joe Holland. The secondary will be breaking a whole new group of starters led by junior Albert Evans. The Boilermakers are looking to return to a bowl game for the first time since 2007.

Recruiting

Schedule

Game summaries

at Notre Dame

vs. Western Illinois

vs. Ball State

Band Day and Family Day

vs. Toledo

at Northwestern

Homecoming and 2001 Rose Bowl Throwback Game

Source: ESPN

at Ohio State

at Illinois

vs. Wisconsin

vs. Michigan

at Michigan State

vs. Indiana

Roster

Statistics
Freshman Quarterback, Rob Henry, became the first ever player lead the Boilermakers in rushing and passing yards in the same season.

Team

Scores by quarter

Offense

Rushing

Passing

Receiving

Defense

Special teams

After the season

2011 NFL Draft

Awards
 Unanimous First-team All-American (Ryan Kerrigan)
 Big Ten Defensive Player of the Year (Ryan Kerrigan)
 Big Ten Defensive Lineman of the Year (Ryan Kerrigan)
 Ryan Kerrigan semifinalist for the Rotary Lombardi Award.

References

Purdue
Purdue Boilermakers football seasons
Purdue Boilermakers football